The 1991 Meath Senior Football Championship is the 99th edition of the Meath GAA's premier club Gaelic football tournament for senior graded teams in County Meath, Ireland. The tournament consists of 15 teams, with the winner going on to represent Meath in the Leinster Senior Club Football Championship. The championship starts with a group stage and then progresses to a knock out stage.

This was Dunderry's return to the grade after claiming the 1990 Meath Intermediate Football Championship title.

Navan O'Mahonys were the defending champions after they defeated Summerhill after a replay in the previous years final, however their quest for five titles in a row was ended by Walterstown at the semi-final stage.

Gaeil Colmcille claimed their 1st S.F.C. title (since being formed from the Kilmainham, Drumnbaragh and Kells Harps clubs in 1966) when beating Walterstown 1–12 to 1-6 after a replay in the final at Pairc Tailteann on 3 November 1991. Terry Ferguson raised the Keegan Cup for Gaeil Colmcille while Eugene McGillick claimed the 'Man of the Match' award.

Nobber were regraded from the S.F.C. after 11 years as a senior club, which included three semi-final appearances. Castletown were also regraded after 15 years in the top-flight.

Team Changes

The following teams have changed division since the 1990 championship season.

To S.F.C.
Promoted from I.F.C.
 Dunderry  -  (Intermediate Champions)

From S.F.C.
Regraded to I.F.C.
 None

Group stage

Group A

Round 1
 Walterstown w, l Moynalvey,
 Summerhill 0-11, 1-6 Trim, 7/4/1991,
 Castletown - Bye,

Round 2
 Trim w, l Castletown, 
 Walterstown w, l Summerhill,
 Moynalvey - Bye,

Round 3
 Moynalvey 2-10, 0-6 Castletown, 19/5/1991,
 Walterstown 1-7, 0-6 Trim, 22/9/1991,
 Summerhill - Bye,

Round 4
 Moynalvey 1-11, 1-9 Trim, 29/9/1991,
 Summerhill w, l Castletown,
 Walterstown - Bye,

Round 5
 Walterstown 1-14, 0-3 Castletown, 29/9/1991,
 Summerhill 0-11, 0-5 Moynalvey, 6/10/1991,
 Trim - Bye,

Group B

Round 1
 Gaeil Colmcille 2-8, 1-5 Skryne, 7/4/1991,
 Slane 1-7, 0-8 St. Michael's, 7/4/1991,
 Navan O'Mahonys - Bye,

Round 2
 Navan O'Mahonys 1–10, 0-13 Skryne, 5/5/1991,
 Gaeil Colmcille w, l St. Michael's,
 Slane - Bye,

Round 3
 Navan O'Mahonys w, l St. Michael's,
 Gaeil Colmcille w, l Slane,
 Skryne - Bye,

Round 4
 Gaeil Colmcille 1-11, 2-7 Navan O'Mahonys, 29/9/1991,
 Skryne 2-7, 0-6 Slane, 29/9/1991,
 St. Michael's - Bye,

Round 5
 Navan O'Mahonys w, l Slane,
 Skryne w/o, scr St. Michael's,
 Gaeil Colmcille - Bye,

Quarter-Final Playoff:
 Navan O'Mahonys 2-8, 1-4 Skryne, 6/10/1991,

Group C

Round 1
 Seneschalstown 2-13, 1-1 Oldcastle, 7/4/1991,
 Dunderry 3-13, 1-5 Nobber, 7/4/1991,
 St. Colmcille's - Bye,

Round 2
 St. Colmcille's 0-11, 1-6 Oldcastle, 14/4/1991,
 Seneschalstown w, l Nobber,
 Dunderry - Bye,

Round 3
 Seneschalstown 0–9, 0-9 Dunderry, 19/5/1991,
 St. Colmcille's 1-8, 1-6 Nobber, Rathkenny, 12/5/1991,
 Oldcastle - Bye,

Round 4
 Seneschalstown 3-19, 0-6 St. Colmcille's, 29/9/1991,
 Dunderry 3-13, 0-10 Oldcastle, 29/9/1991,
 Nobber - Bye,

Round 5
 Dunderry 2-6, 0-7 St. Colmcille's, 13/10/1991,
 Oldcastle w, l Nobber
 Seneschalstown - Bye,

Knock-out Stages
The teams in the quarter-finals are the second placed teams from each group and the Group C winner. The teams in the semi finals are Group A and B winners along with the quarter final winners.

Quarter-Finals:
 Seneschalstown 0-10, 1-4 Summerhill, 20/10/1991,
 Navan O'Mahonys 0-8, 0-6 Dunderry, 20/10/1991,

Semi-Finals:
 Gaeil Colmcille 3-15, 0-8 Seneschalstown, 27/10/1991,
 Walterstown 0-12, 0-7 Navan O'Mahonys, 27/10/1991,

Final:
 Gaeil Colmcille 1-12, 1-6 Walterstown, Pairc Tailteann, 3/11/1991,

Leinster Senior Club Football Championship
Quarter-Final:
 Baltinglass 0-9, 0-8 Gaeil Colmcille, Aughrim, 17/11/1991,

References

External links

Meath Senior Football Championship
Meath Senior Football Championship